Margaret Joan Beazley, (born 23 July 1951) is an Australian jurist who is the 39th and current governor of New South Wales, serving since 2 May 2019. She was the president of the New South Wales Court of Appeal, the first woman to hold the office, from 2013 until February 2019.

Biography

Early life

She was educated at Catholic schools – St Declan's Primary School in Penshurst, St Joseph's Girls High School in Kogarah, and Mount Saint Joseph, Milperra. Beazley graduated from the Sydney Law School at the University of Sydney in 1974 in law, with honours.

Legal career
Beazley served her articles of clerkship with Winter & Sharp, and was admitted to the New South Wales Bar in 1975. She was appointed Queen's Counsel in 1989.

Beazley was a Judicial Member of the Equal Opportunity Tribunal from 1984 to 1988. She was an Acting District Court Judge from 1990 to 1991. From 1991 to 1992, Beazley served as Assistant Commissioner of the Independent Commission Against Corruption. She was a judge of the Federal Court of Australia from 1993 to 1996, an additional Judge of the Supreme Court of the Australian Capital Territory from 1994 to 1997, and a judge of the Industrial Relations Court of Australia from 1994 to 1996.

From 1996 to 2019, she was a Judge of Appeal of the New South Wales Court of Appeal.  She was President of the court, the first woman to hold the office, from 2013 until February 2019.

Beazley has also served on the Australian Executive of Amnesty International (1980).

Governor of New South Wales

In January 2019, Beazley accepted the position of 39th Governor of New South Wales, succeeding David Hurley, and was sworn in as governor on 2 May 2019. In 2020, she was promoted to Companion of the Order of Australia for eminent service to the people of New South Wales, particularly through leadership roles in the judiciary, and as a mentor of young women lawyers.

In November 2021, it was reported that a member of the governor's staff had anonymously lodged whistleblower complaints about bullying with the Department of Premier and Cabinet, which provides staff for the governor's office. Following an investigation, the Departmentwhile not referring to a decisionthanked the complainant and promised measures to foster a "respectful" workplace culture in the office.

Titles, styles and honours

Titles

The Governor's style and title in full is: Her Excellency The Honourable Margaret Beazley, Companion of the Order of Australia, King's Counsel, Governor of the State of New South Wales in the Commonwealth of Australia.

Honours and awards

Honorary appointments

  2019: Honorary Colonel of the Royal New South Wales Regiment.
  2019: Governor of the New South Wales Police Force.
  2019: Deputy Prior of the Order of St John.
  2019: Honorary Commodore, Royal Australian Navy.
  2019: Honorary Air Commodore of No. 22 Squadron Royal Australian Air Force.

Honorary degrees

  2008: Honorary Doctorate of Laws (LLD) by the University of Sydney.
  2019: Honorary Doctorate of Laws (LLD) by the Australian Catholic University.
  2022: Honorary Doctorate of Laws (LLD) by The University of Notre Dame Australia.

Personal life
Beazley is married to Dennis Wilson. She has three adult children from her first marriage to barrister Alan Sullivan. She and Sullivan were reportedly "the first husband and wife from the private legal profession to become QCs".

See also

 List of judges of the Supreme Court of New South Wales

References

1951 births
Living people
Governors of New South Wales
Judges of the Federal Court of Australia
Judges of the Supreme Court of New South Wales
Australian King's Counsel
Australian women judges
Presidents of the NSW Court of Appeal
Companions of the Order of Australia
20th-century Australian judges
21st-century Australian judges
Judges of the Supreme Court of the Australian Capital Territory
Judges of the Industrial Relations Court of Australia
Judges of the District Court of NSW
20th-century women judges
21st-century women judges
20th-century Australian women